École secondaire d'Anjou is a francophone public co-educational secondary school located in most part in Mercier-Hochelaga-Maisonneuve borough and in small part in Anjou borough in Montreal. Part of the Commission scolaire de la Pointe-de-l'Île, it was originally in the catholic School board Commission scolaire Jérôme-Le Royer before the 1998 reorganization of School boards from religious communities into linguistic communities in Quebec. École secondaire d'Anjou offers regular and special education programs, welcoming classes, professional programs and adults programs. This school hosts actually 1,337 students and 67 teachers.

Programs and services
Besides the regular program, the school offers specialized programs in Advanced English, Arts and multimedia, Physical education, Music and Science. The technical and professional education offers courses in Private security guard, Semi-automatic welding, High-pressure welding, Machining digital machines with digital control, Operation of production equipments, Welding and assembly, Finishing techniques and Automobile vehicles sales and advisory.

Many others professional services are offered to the students: nurse, psychologist, social worker, guidance counsellor, psychoeducator, counsellor in spiritual life and community involvement, leisure technician, special education technician, intervention worker for student retention, drug addiction worker, supervisors, etc. Finally, a homework assistance program is offered after school from former students.

Student life

Events
Noon Activities
School Prom
Graduation Ceremonies
Concerts
Terry Fox Race
Science Exhibition
New students Party
Meritas Gala
Sports Gala
Theme days
Mini Marathon
Peer Helpers
Disco Nights for 13–17 years old (1982-1988)
Multicultural Supper
Theatre
Museum Visits
Cultural Trips

Awards
Handball (female): provincial scholar champions (1984, 1985)

Notable students
Sylvie Moreau (1978-1982), actress;
Pierre Turgeon, (1984-1985) National Hockey League player;
Sylvain Turgeon (1980-1981), National Hockey League player.

Notable teachers
Monic Brassard, plastic arts teacher (1974-1997) and Laureate artist in 2019 for the Governor General's Award in Visual and Media arts;
Yvon Cozic, plastic arts teacher (1974-1997) and Laureate artist in 2019 for the Governor General's Award in Visual and Media arts.

References

External links
 École secondaire d'Anjou 
  

High schools in Quebec